Bouras is a surname. Notable people with the surname include:

Athanasios Bouras, Greek politician
Charalambos Bouras, Greek architect and historian
Djamel Bouras (born 1971), French judoka
Hamza Bouras (born 1987), Algerian sailor
Gillian Bouras (born 1945), Australian writer
Nick Bouras, Greek psychiatrist
Zahra Bouras (born 1987), Algerian middle-distance runner

See also
Boura (disambiguation)